Riverside–La Sierra is a train station served by Metrolink commuter rail in the La Sierra South neighborhood of Riverside, California, United States. Due to its large parking area, it is the second-largest station served by Metrolink, after Union Station. La Sierra University is located a few miles from the station.

The station is owned by the Riverside County Transportation Commission (RCTC).

History

Riverside–La Sierra opened on October 2, 1995 with the opening of the Inland Empire–Orange County (IEOC) Line.

In 2002, Riverside Public Utilities began building a solar covered carport at the station. The carport was completed in 2003.

Current services

Rail services

Bus services
Riverside Transit Agency Routes 15 and 200 stops at the station, as does Orange County Transportation Authority Route 794.

Platforms and tracks

Future development

RCTC developed plans in the 2000s to build a transit-oriented development (TOD) at the station, enlarge the parking lot, and build improved bus facilities. In 2010, Caltrans granted funds to increase parking capacity at the station. , the parking expansion was in the public comment phase, and the TOD apartment complex was under construction.

References

External links

 
 Metrolink stations at the Riverside County Transportation Commission website

Metrolink stations in Riverside County, California
Transportation in Riverside, California
Railway stations in the United States opened in 1995
1995 establishments in California